The Münster rebellion ("Anabaptist dominion of Münster") was an attempt by radical Anabaptists to establish a communal sectarian government in the German city of Münster  then under the large Prince-Bishopric of Münster in the Holy Roman Empire.

The city was under Anabaptist rule from February 1534, when the city hall was seized and Bernhard Knipperdolling installed as mayor, until its fall in June 1535. It was Melchior Hoffman, who initiated adult baptism in Strasbourg in 1530, and his line of eschatological Anabaptism, that helped lay the foundations for the events of 1534–35 in Münster.

Rebellion

After the German Peasants' War (1524–1525), a forceful attempt to establish theocracy was made at Münster, in Westphalia (1532–1535). Here the Anabaptists had gained considerable influence, through the adhesion of Bernhard Rothmann, the Lutheran pastor, and several prominent citizens and leaders, including Jan Matthys (also spelled Matthijs, Mathijsz, Matthyssen, Mathyszoon), a baker from Haarlem, and Jan Bockelson (or Beukelszoon), a tailor from Leiden. Bernhard Rothmann was a tireless and vitriolic opponent of Catholicism and a writer of pamphlets that were published by his ally, the wealthy wool merchant Bernhard Knipperdolling. The pamphlets at first denounced Catholicism from a radical Lutheran perspective, but soon started to proclaim that the Bible called for the absolute equality of man in all matters, including the distribution of wealth. The pamphlets, which were distributed throughout northern Germany, called upon the poor of the region to join the citizens of Münster to share the wealth of the town and benefit spiritually from being the elect of Heaven.

With so many Anabaptist adherents in the town, Rothmann and his allies had little difficulty obtaining possession of it at the elections for the magistracy and placing Bernhard Knipperdolling as the mayor, after deposing the mainly Lutheran magistrates, who, until then, had seen him as an ally in their own distrust of, and dislike for, Catholics. Matthys was a follower of Melchior Hoffman, and after Hoffman's imprisonment at Strasbourg Matthys obtained a considerable following in the Low Countries, including Bockelson, who became known as John of Leiden. John of Leiden and Gerrit Boekbinder had visited Münster, and returned with a report that Bernhard Rothmann was in Münster teaching doctrines similar to their own. Matthys identified Münster as the "New Jerusalem", and on January 5, 1534, a number of his disciples entered the city and introduced adult baptism. Rothmann apparently accepted "baptism" that day, and well over 1000 adults were soon baptised. Vigorous preparations were made not only to hold what had been gained but to spread their beliefs to other areas. The many Lutherans who left were outnumbered by the arriving Anabaptists. There was an orgy of iconoclasm in cathedrals and monasteries, and rebaptism became compulsory. The property of emigrants was shared out with the poor, and soon a proclamation was issued that all property was to be held in common.

Siege
The city was besieged by Franz von Waldeck, its expelled bishop. In April 1534, on Easter Sunday, Matthys, who had prophesied God's judgment to come on the wicked on that day, led a procession from the city with twelve followers, as he believed himself the second Gideon. He and his followers were cut off and taken. Matthys was killed, his head placed on a pole for all in the city to see, and his genitals nailed to the city gate.

The 25-year-old John of Leiden was subsequently recognized as Matthys' religious and political successor, justifying his authority and actions by claiming visions from heaven. His authority grew until eventually he proclaimed himself the successor of David and adopted royal regalia, honors, and absolute power in the new "Zion". There were now in the town at least three times as many women of marriageable age as men, so he made polygamy compulsory, and he himself took sixteen wives. (John is said to have beheaded Elisabeth Wandscherer in the marketplace for refusing to marry him, though this act might have been falsely attributed to him after his death.) Meanwhile, most of the residents of Münster were starving as a result of the year-long siege.

After lengthy resistance, the city was taken by the besiegers on June 24, 1535, and John of Leiden and several other prominent Anabaptist leaders were captured and imprisoned. In January 1536 John of Leiden, Bernhard Knipperdolling and one more prominent follower, Bernhard Krechting, were tortured and executed in the marketplace of Münster. Their bodies were exhibited in cages which hung from the steeple of St. Lambert's Church. The bones were removed later, but the cages hang there still.

Aftermath

The Münster Rebellion was a turning point for the Anabaptist movement. It never again had the opportunity of assuming political importance, as both Catholic and Lutheran civil powers adopted stringent measures to counter this. It is difficult to trace the subsequent history of the group as a religious body, through changes in the names used and beliefs held.

The Batenburgers under Jan van Batenburg preserved the violent millennialist stream of Anabaptism seen at Münster. They were polygamous and believed force was justified against anyone not in their sect. Their movement went underground after the suppression of the Münster Rebellion, with members posing as Catholics or Lutherans as necessary. Some nonresistant Anabaptists found leaders in Menno Simons and the brothers Obbe and Dirk Philips, Dutch Anabaptist leaders who repudiated the distinctive doctrines of the Münster Anabaptists. This group eventually became known as the Mennonites after Simons. They rejected any use of violence and preached a faith based on compassion and love of enemy.

In August 1536 the leaders of Anabaptist groups influenced by Melchior Hoffman met in Bocholt in an attempt to maintain unity. The meeting included followers of Batenburg, survivors of Münster, David Joris and his sympathisers, and the nonresistant Anabaptists. At this meeting the major areas of dispute between the sects were polygamous marriage and the use of force against non-believers. Joris proposed compromise by declaring the time had not yet come to fight against the authorities, and that it would be unwise to kill any non-Anabaptists. The gathered Anabaptists agreed to the compromise of no more force, but the meeting did not prevent the fragmentation of Anabaptism.

Works of fiction
 A Tale of a Tub, In the allegory of Jonathan Swift's first major work, brother "Jack" is based on "Jack of Leyden"
 Le prophète, an 1849 opera by Giacomo Meyerbeer that highly fictionalizes the rebellion
 Q, by Luther Blissett .
 Speak to Her Kindly: A Novel of the Anabaptists, by Jonathan Rainbow, 
  – German historical mini-series that portrays the events of the Münster Rebellion.
 The Unfortunate Traveller by Thomas Nashe describes the events of the rebellion
 The Abyss "L'Œuvre au noir", by Marguerite Yourcenar
 The Garden of Earthly Delights by Nicholas Salaman
 The Friends of God, by Peter Vansittart
 Perfection, by Anita Mason
 Rules For a Film about Anabaptists, film by Georg Brintrup, Germany 1975/76
 Die Wiedertäufer, a play by Friedrich Dürrenmatt, translated by Lauren Friesen as The Anabaptists (unpublished MSS in various libraries, including the Graduate Theological Union).  
 Orfeo, a novel by Richard Powers, whose main character composes an opera retelling the story
 In Nomine Dei, a play by José Saramago
 Divara – Wasser und Blut (Divara, Water and Blood), a German-language opera by Azio Corghi to a libretto by the composer after the play by Saramago

References

Works cited

Further reading

 Communism in Central Europe in the Time of the Reformation, by Karl Kautsky
 The Friends of God (The Siege in the US), by Peter Vansittart
 The Tailor King: The Rise and Fall of the Anabaptist Kingdom of Munster, by Anthony Arthur, 
 Bockelson, by Fritz Reck-Malleczewen
 Freaks of Fanaticism and Other Strange Events, by Sabine Baring-Gould, Gutenberg, 1891
 
 Narrative of the Anabaptist Madness: The Overthrow of Münster, the Famous Metropolis of Westphalia (Studies in the History of Christian Traditions; 132), by Hermann von Kerssenbroch. Translated with introduction and notes by Christopher S. Mackay. Brill Academic Publishers, 2007; .

External links

 Zürich: Seedbed of Radical Change  offers a more in depth look at attempts to rehabilitate the Anabaptist label after Münster
 "Der wedderdoeper eidt" / oath of the Münster Anabaptists
 Münster Anabaptists in the Global Anabaptist Mennonite Encyclopedia Online
 "German Zion: The Anabaptist Rebellion at Munster", Historical article about the Revolt.
 BBC Radio 4. In Our Time: The Siege of Münster.
 "Hardcore History 48" Dan Carlin's podcast which addresses the subject of The Münster Rebellion.
 Conversations – ABC Radio: The blood-soaked history of the Münster Anabaptists

Christian communism
Christian radicalism
History of Anabaptists
Rebellion
Polygamy
Rebellions in Germany
1534 in the Holy Roman Empire
1535 in the Holy Roman Empire